Baziar Kola (also Romanized as Bāzīār Kolā) is a village in Kalej Rural District, in the Central District of Nowshahr County, Mazandaran Province, Iran. At the 2006 census, its population was 564, in 137 families.

References 

Populated places in Nowshahr County